The Polish records in swimming are the fastest ever performances of swimmers from Poland, which are recognised and ratified by Polski Związek Pływacki (Polish Swimming Association, PZP).

All records were set in finals unless noted otherwise.

Long Course (50 m)

Men

Women

Mixed relay

Short Course (25 m)

Men

Women

Mixed relay

Notes

References
General
Polish Long Course Records - Men 26 February 2023 updated
Polish Long Course Records - Women 25 February 2023 updated
Polish Long Course Records - Mixed Relay 16 August 2022 updated
Polish Short Course Records - Men 15 December 2022 updated
Polish Short Course Records - Women 3 November 2022 updated
Polish Short Course Records - Mixed Relay 6 November 2021 updated
Specific

External links
PZP web site

Poland
Records
Swimming
Swimming